VTV was a Dutch television station. It used to timeshare with Kindernet. It launched on 2 October 1995. The first letter "V" stood for Vesta, the Roman goddess of the hearth and home. The channel's main target were women aged between 20 and 40 years. Léonie Sazias was the main presenter. Due to its poor ratings VTV closed on 1 July 1996.

Programming
 Another World
 Binnenste Buiten
 De Hort Op
 Lekker Lijf
 Ojevaarsjo
 Vita Vesta
 Voel Je Lekker
 Wie Kookt Er Vandaag?

References 

Defunct television channels in the Netherlands
Television channels and stations established in 1995
Television channels and stations disestablished in 1996